Friedrich Engel may refer to:

 Friedrich Engel (mathematician) (1861–1941), German mathematician
 Friedrich Engel (SS officer) (1909–2006), German SS officer

See also
 Friedrich Engels (1820–1895), philosopher
 Friedrich Engelhorn (1821–1902), industrialist